The Ministry of Justice and Human Rights is the Justice ministry of the following countries

 Ministry of Justice and Human Rights (Argentina)
 Ministry of Justice and Human Rights (Chile)
 Ministry of Justice and Human Rights (Iceland)
 Ministry of Justice and Human Rights (Peru)